Lloyd Carlisle McCuiston Jr. (March 26, 1918 – November 9, 2021) was an American politician. He was a member of the Arkansas House of Representatives, serving from 1961 to 1994. He was a member of the Democratic party. McCuiston was also a veteran of World War II, having served in the US Navy. In February 2018, McCuiston appeared in the Arkansas House of Representatives alongside eight other former Speakers.

He turned 100 in March 2018 and died in Memphis on November 9, 2021, at the age of 103.

References

1918 births
2021 deaths
20th-century American politicians
American centenarians
Men centenarians
Military personnel from Tennessee
Politicians from Memphis, Tennessee
Speakers of the Arkansas House of Representatives
Democratic Party members of the Arkansas House of Representatives
United States Navy personnel of World War II